This is a complete list of members of the United States Senate during the 93rd United States Congress listed by seniority, from January 3, 1973, to January 3, 1975.

Order of service is based on the commencement of the senator's first term. Behind this is former service as a senator (only giving the senator seniority within his or her new incoming class), service as vice president, a House member, a cabinet secretary, or a governor of a state. The final factor is the population of the senator's state.

The most senior junior senator in this Congress was J. William Fulbright. The most junior senior senator in this congress was William Roth, until William Saxbe resigned on January 3, 1974. Robert Taft then held the distinction until Marlow Cook resigned on December 27, 1974, after which it was held by Walter Huddleston.

Senators who were sworn in during the middle of the two-year congressional term (up until the last senator who was not sworn in early after winning the November 1974 election) are listed at the end of the list with no number.

Terms of service

U.S. Senate seniority list

See also
93rd United States Congress
List of members of the United States House of Representatives in the 93rd Congress by seniority

Notes

External links
Senate Seniority List

093